Lixus is a genus of true weevils in the beetle family Curculionidae. There are at least 950 described species in Lixus.

See also
 List of Lixus species

References

Lixinae
Beetles of Europe